Pengover Green is a hamlet east of Liskeard in east Cornwall, England.

Local Industry 
Local abattoir, Peake (GB) Limited is situated 900m southwest of the hamlet.

References

Hamlets in Cornwall